Abid Kashmiri is a Pakistani film, television and stage actor and a comedian. He has been working in Pakistani Urdu films and dramas as well as working in stage dramas.

Filmography 
 Bazar-e-Husan, 1988
 Aainak Wala Jinn, 1995
 Jeety Hain Shaan Se, 1996
 Kites Grounded

Television 
 Suraj Key Sath Sath
 Lahori Gate
 Home Sweet Home
 Samundar (character Gullu Badshah)
S.H.E.

Awards 
He has been awarded the Nigar Award for his best comedy in the film Bazar-e-Husan (1988).

References

External links 
 

Pakistani male comedians
Pakistani male film actors
Pakistani male television actors
Living people
Pakistani people of Kashmiri descent
Nigar Award winners
1950 births